The Roar on the Shore was a motorcycle rally that took place in Erie, Pennsylvania and North East, Pennsylvania.

History 
The Roar on the Shore was started in 2007 by the Erie Port Authority as a way to bring visitors to Erie's bayfront. The Erie Port Authority partnered with other local organizations including ABATE, Erie Motorcycle Club, Legion Riders 773, Charities for Children and the Manufacturer's Association of Erie. In 2008, the Manufacturer's Association of Erie took the lead role in the rally. Its last event was in 2019. 2020 was cancelled on grounds of COVID-19 pandemic. It was announced in 2021 that Roar on the Shore would not return.

Events 
Every year the rally was kicked off with "Bringin' In The Roar": a motorcycle parade from Presque Isle Downs and Casino in Summit Township to Lake Erie Speedway in North East. Other major events are the "Thunder On The Isle", a motorcycle ride around Presque Isle State Park, and the "Roar To The Vineyards Poker Run" to North East.

See also 
 List of festivals in Pennsylvania

References

External links 
 Roar on the Shore

Culture of Erie, Pennsylvania
Festivals in Pennsylvania
Motorcycle rallies in the United States
Recurring events established in 2007
Tourist attractions in Erie, Pennsylvania